Eric Spenser Jokisch (born July 29, 1989) is an American professional baseball pitcher for the Kiwoom Heroes of the KBO League. He has played in  Major League Baseball (MLB) for the Chicago Cubs.

Career

Amateur
Jokisch was drafted by the Cleveland Indians in the 39th round of the 2007 Major League Baseball Draft out of Virginia High School in Virginia, Illinois, but did not sign and played college baseball at Northwestern University. In 2009, he played collegiate summer baseball with the Harwich Mariners of the Cape Cod Baseball League.

Chicago Cubs
He was selected by the Chicago Cubs in the 11th round of the 2010 Major League Baseball Draft and signed. In 2013, while pitching for the Tennessee Smokies, he pitched a no-hitter.

Jokisch was called up to the majors for the first time on September 2, 2014.

Miami Marlins
Jokisch was claimed off waivers by the Miami Marlins on April 13, 2016.

Texas Rangers
After being designated for assignment, the Marlins traded Jokisch to the Rangers in exchange for Pedro Ciriaco, on July 8, 2016.

Oakland Athletics
He elected free agency on November 6, 2017. He later signed a minor league contract with the Oakland Athletics for 2018. He elected free agency on November 2, 2018.

Kiwoom Heroes
On November 23, 2018, Jokisch signed a one-year, $500,000 contract with the Kiwoom Heroes of the KBO League. He produced a 13–9 record with a 3.13 ERA over 181.1 innings in 2019. Jokisch re-signed with Kiwoom for the 2020 season on a one-year contract worth $700,000. In 2020 Jokisch  led the team with 159.2 innings with an ERA of 2.14 ,winning the league’s ERA title. He re-signed with the Heroes on a one year $900k deal for the 2021 season on December 2, 2020. Jokisch tied for the league lead in wins (16), while ranking second in innings pitched and fourth in ERA (2.93). On December 30, 2021, he re-signed with the Heroes on a one-year deal worth up to $1.3 million. On December 11, 2022, Jokisch re-signed a one-year contract worth $1.5 million.

References

External links

Northwestern Wildcats bio

1989 births
Living people
American expatriate baseball players in South Korea
Sportspeople from Springfield, Illinois
Baseball players from Illinois
Major League Baseball pitchers
KBO League pitchers
Chicago Cubs players
Kiwoom Heroes players
Northwestern Wildcats baseball players
Harwich Mariners players
Arizona League Cubs players
Boise Hawks players
Peoria Chiefs players
Tennessee Smokies players
Daytona Cubs players
Iowa Cubs players
New Orleans Zephyrs players
Jacksonville Suns players
Round Rock Express players
Jackson Generals (Southern League) players
Reno Aces players
Nashville Sounds players